Santa Bárbara is a city and seat of the municipality of Santa Bárbara, in the northern Mexican state of Chihuahua. As of 2010, the city of Santa Bárbara had a population of 8,765, up from 8,673 as of 2005.

History

Santa Bárbara, Chihuahua, was established in 1567 by Spanish conquistador Rodrigo del Rio de Losa during the rule of Francisco de Ibarra, governor of the state of Nueva Vizcaya, New Spain. The native peoples in the region when the Spanish arrived were the Conchos people who according to Spanish records lived on a diet consisting of mainly roots and prickly pears. The Spanish were attracted to the region by discoveries of silver and Santa Barbara grew from a population of 30 in 1575 to 7,000 in 1600. It was the northernmost outpost of Nueva Espana in the 16th century. Santa Barbara became a wealthy frontier town of slavers, ranchers, miners, adventurers, and priests.

Santa Barbara is located on a tributary of the Conchos River and was the jumping off spot for several expeditions to New Mexico including Chamuscado and Rodriguez in 1581-1582, Antonio de Espejo in 1582-1583, and Juan de Onate in 1597.   
  
On December 17, 1930, the town was designated a city by an act of the legislature. Today, Santa Barbara is overshadowed by nearby Parral but the extensive mine tailings tell of its former prominence.

Economy

The municipality produces wood products and nuts from trees such as walnuts, mesquite, junipers, acamos, gatuños, willows and madroños. Fruits grown in the region are peach, pear and apple. These products are being sold worldwide. The city also continues to rely on mining of lead, silver, gold, zinc, fluorite and other minerals. Lead is now the most important mineral produced in this city. The mines collectively occupy 7,180 hectares of the municipality.

Tourist attractions

Tourists visit caves, mountain ranges, and other natural attraction in the region.  The caves have ancient paintings on the cave walls made by early indigenous people who resided here long before the arrival of the Spaniards.

References

Populated places in Chihuahua (state)
Populated places established in 1567
1567 establishments in the Spanish Empire